Ramkumar Ganesan (born 12 January 1955) is an Indian film producer and actor. He is the head of Sivaji Productions, a film productions company that has produced several films, particularly featuring his father Sivaji Ganesan or his younger brother Prabhu.

Early life
Born in Chennai, Tamil Nadu, India, Ramkumar is the eldest son of Tamil actor Sivaji Ganesan and the older brother of Tamil actor Prabhu, Shanti and Thenmozhi. He graduated with a degree in business administration from Vivekananda College and began working at the production company Sivaji Productions established by his father.

Career
Ramkumar took over Sivaji Productions after his uncle V. C. Shanmugham had died. The company is being led by Ramkumar along with his brother Prabhu. The most notable production under Ramkumar remains the blockbuster Chandramukhi in 2005. In 2009, the brothers produced the film Aasal starring Ajith Kumar. Ramkumar has also acted in a couple of scenes, playing notable supporting roles in Aruvadai Naal and My Dear Marthandan, both starring Prabhu. He appeared as one of the antagonists in director Shankar's I.

Personal life
Ramkumar has been married to Kannamal. They have three sons, Dushyanth who works with Sivaji Productions and has acted in the Tamil films Success and Machi, and twins Dharshan and Rishyan.

Filmography

References 

Living people
Tamil film producers
Film producers from Chennai
Indian male film actors
Tamil male actors
Male actors from Chennai
1952 births